"Feel My Rhythm" is a song recorded by South Korean girl group Red Velvet for their extended play The ReVe Festival 2022 – Feel My Rhythm (2022). Composed by Jake K, Maria Marcus, Andreas Öberg, and MCK and Korean lyrics written by Seo Ji-eum, the dance-pop song was released as the lead single of the extended play (EP) on March 21, 2022 through SM Entertainment, along with an accompanying music video.

Background and release
Seven months after Red Velvet released their sixth EP Queendom, it was reported that the group was preparing new music. On February 18, 2022, SM Entertainment announced that the group would be releasing a new album the following month. The title of the EP, The ReVe Festival 2022 – Feel My Rhythm, was confirmed on March 2. "Feel My Rhythm" was set for official digital release on March 21, 2022, along with the EP. On March 18, the music video teaser was released; the 30-second clip opens with the melody of "Air on the G String" as dancers dressed in "creepy" bird-inspired outfits waltz around the group. The dark scene features psychedelic references and classical music in the background. The music video for the song was also inspired by "Air on the G String" and produced in the form of an opera that pays homage to a famous artwork.

Composition

"Feel My Rhythm" was composed by Jake K, Maria Marcus, Andreas Öberg, and MCK, while the lyrics were written by Seo Ji-eum. Musically, it is a dance-pop song that samples the Bach arrangement "Air on the G String", featuring "delicate" and "elegant" string melodies, "intense" trap beats, and "fantastic" vocal charm. The song draws inspiration from Bach and ballet, blending modern pop sensibilities with classical music. It was composed in the key of C-sharp major, with a tempo of 158 beats per minute. Its lyrics vividly unravel one's journey to enjoy themselves freely through time and space along with the song.

Commercial performance 
"Feel My Rhythm" debuted and peaked at number three on South Korea's Gaon Digital Chart in the chart issue dated March 20–26, 2022. The song also debuted and peaked at number three on the component Download Chart. It also debuted at number six on the component Streaming Chart, peaking at number three in the chart issued a week later. Additionally, it also debuted at number 36 on the component BGM Chart, peaking at number 32 in the chart issued a week later. Additionally, it debuted at number 21 on the Billboard K-pop Hot 100 in the chart issue dated April 2, 2022, peaking at number three in the chart issued a week later. In Japan, the song debuted and peaked at number 47 on the Billboard Japan Japan Hot 100 in the chart issue dated March 30, 2022; on its component charts, the song debuted and peaked at number 61 on the Top Download Songs, and number 52 on the Top Streaming Songs. The song also debuted and peaked at number 41 on the Oricon Combined Singles in the chart issue dated April 4, 2022. In Hong Kong, the song debuted at number 18 on the Hong Kong Songs chart in the chart issue dated April 2, 2022, peaking at number 12 in the chart issued a week later. In Taiwan, the song debuted at number 23 on the Taiwan Songs chart in the chart issue dated April 2, 2022, peaking at number 16 in the chart issued a week later.

In Indonesia, the song debuted at number eight on the Indonesia Songs chart in the chart issue dated April 2, 2022, peaking at number three in the chart issued a week later. In Malaysia, the song debuted at number 15 on RIM's Top 20 Most Streamed International Singles in the chart issue dated March 18–24, 2022, peaking at number five in the chart issued a week later. Additionally, the song debuted at number 10 on the Malaysia Songs chart in the chart issue dated April 2, 2022, peaking at number five in the chart issued a week later. In the Philippines, the song debuted at number 16 on the Philippine Songs chart in the chart issue dated April 2, 2022, peaking at number 15 in the chart issued a week later. In Singapore, the song debuted at number 21 on the RIAS's Top Streaming Chart in the chart issue dated March 18–24, 2022, peaking at number six in the chart issued a week later. It also debuted at number seven on the RIAS Top Regional Chart in the chart issue dated March 18–24, 2022, peaking at number one in the chart issued a week later. Additionally, it debuted at number 21 on the Singapore Songs chart in the chart issue dated April 2, 2022, peaking at number nine in the chart issued a week later. In Vietnam, the song debuted at number eight on the Billboard Vietnam Vietnam Hot 100 in the chart issue dated March 31, 2022, peaking at number six in the chart issued a week later. In New Zealand, the song debuted at number 24 on RMNZ Hot Singles in the chart issue dated March 28, 2022.

In the United States, the song debuted at number five on the Billboard World Digital Song Sales in the chart issue dated April 2, 2022. Globally, the song debuted at number 61 on the Billboard Global 200 in the chart issue dated April 2, 2022, peaking at number 36 in the chart issued a week later. It also debuted at number 37 on the Billboard Global Excl. US in the chart issue dated April 2, 2022, peaking at number 20 in the chart issued a week later. Additionally, the song debuted at number 16 on the Billboard Hot Trending Songs in the chart issue dated April 9, 2022.

Promotion
Prior to the extended play's release, on March 21, 2022, Red Velvet held a live event called "The ReVe Festival 2022 – Feel My Rhythm Countdown Live" on YouTube to introduce the extended play and its songs, including "Feel My Rhythm".

Orchestra version 
SM Classics collaborated with Seoul Philharmonic Orchestra to release the orchestral version of "Feel My Rhythm" on July 1, 2022, alongside the accompanying music video. It is the second orchestra re-arrangement of Red Velvet's song after "Red Flavor".

Accolades

Credits and personnel 
Credits adapted from the liner notes of The ReVe Festival 2022 – Feel My Rhythm.

Studio

 SM SSAM Studio – recording, digital editing
 SM Yellow Tail Studio – recording
 Sound Pool Studios – digital editing
 SM Blue Cup Studio – mixing

Personnel

 Red Velvet (Irene, Seulgi, Wendy, Joy, Yeri) – vocals, background vocals
 Seo Ji-eum – Korean lyrics
 Jake K (ARTiffect) – composition, arrangement, directing, drum, bass, guitar, piano, synthesizer, MIDI string
 Maria Marcus – composition, background vocals
 Andreas Öberg – composition
 MCK (ARTiffect) – composition, arrangement, drum, bass, guitar, piano, synthesizer, MIDI string
 Johann Sebastian Bach – original writer
 Kang Eun-ji – recording, digital editing
 Noh Min-ji – recording
 Jeong Ho-jin – digital editing
 Jeong Eui-seok – mixing

Charts

Weekly charts

Monthly charts

Year-end charts

Release history

See also 

 List of Music Bank Chart winners (2022)

References

Red Velvet (group) songs
2022 singles
2022 songs
SM Entertainment singles
Songs written by Andreas Öberg